State Route 9 (SR 9), (known locally as Highway 9) is an  north–south state highway in the northern part of the U.S. state of Georgia. It travels from Atlanta to Turners Corner, north-northeast of Dahlonega. It is concurrent with U.S. Route 19 (US 19) from its southern terminus, in northwest Atlanta, to Roswell Road at Interstate 285 (I-285), in Sandy Springs. It is also concurrent with US 19 from Dahlonega to its northern terminus at US 129/SR 11.

SR 9 parallels US 19/SR 400 for much its length. Because of its proximity to US 19/SR 400, it is a viable alternate to the congested "Alpharetta Autobahn". Along its length, SR 9 travels through the cities of Atlanta, Sandy Springs, Roswell, Alpharetta, Cumming, Dawsonville, and Dahlonega.

Route description 

At its furthest southern point, SR 9 begins at the intersection of US 19 (14th Street N.W.) and US 41/SR 3 (Northside Drive) in Atlanta. It travels to the east to an intersection with West Peachtree Street N.W., and turns north here, shortly after crossing over I-75. SR 9 is signed as Peachtree Street N.W. from just south of I-85, and crosses under I-85 just north of the I-75/I-85 (Downtown Connector) interchange north of Downtown Atlanta. Just south of Piedmont Hospital, SR 9 changes names from Peachtree Street N.W. to Peachtree Road N.W.

From its intersection with SR 141, which begins here, SR 9 is signed as Roswell Road N.W. The highway continues to travel generally north, crossing I-285 at exit 25. From its southern terminus to this point, SR 9 also travels concurrent with US 19, but continues north on its own from this point to Dahlonega. It also largely parallels SR 400 from here, travelling through Sandy Springs and crossing the Chattahoochee River into Roswell and has reversible lanes up to its intersection with SR 120. The two highways are concurrent from here to its intersection with Old Milton Parkway. SR 9 is interchangeably signed as Atlanta Street or Alpharetta Street on this stretch, and as Alpharetta Highway from downtown Roswell and crosses SR 92 and SR 140 and passes North Fulton Regional Hospital. From downtown Alpharetta, it is interchangeably signed as Cumming Highway, Atlanta Highway, or Atlanta Road. Near exit 14 of SR 400, SR 9 starts to travel concurrent with SR 20, until they split again in downtown Cumming.

From here, SR 9 is signed as Dahlonega Highway, and travels concurrent with SR 306 to Keith Bridge Road. It continues to travel north on its own through Dawsonville, and then travels concurrent with SR 52 from their intersection to just north of Dahlonega. From here, it is again concurrent with US 19/SR 60, until SR 60 splits off in Porter Springs. SR 9 continues alongside US 19 until its terminus at the intersection with US 129/SR 11 at Turners Corner.

The following portions of SR 9 are part of the National Highway System, a system of routes determined to be the most important for the nation's economy, mobility, and defense:
From its southern terminus to the northern end of the SR 120 concurrency in Alpharetta
The entire length of the US 19 concurrency, from Dahlonega to its northern terminus

History

1920s and 1930s 

SR 9 was established at least as early as 1919 along its current route. In 1921, it was extended to Blairsville, concurrent with SR 11. By the end of 1926, it had a "completed hard surface" from Atlanta to the northern part of Sandy Springs, a "sand clay or top soil" surface from the northern part of Sandy Springs to just southwest of Dahlonega, a "completed semi-hard surface" from just southwest of Dahlonega to that city. The extension to Blairsville was decommissioned. By the end of 1930, it had a completed hard surface from just southwest of Dahlonega to that city. By 1932, it had a completed semi-hard surface from the northern part of Sandy Springs to the Forsyth–Dawson county line, a sand clay or top soil surface from the county line to just southwest of Dahlonega, and a "completed grading, no surface course" from just northeast of Dahlonega to its northern terminus. At this time, US 19 was designated along the entire length of SR 9. The next month, the highway had a completed semi-hard surface from the Forsyth–Dawson county line to just north of it and from just northeast of Dahlonega to its northern terminus. In September of that year, it had a completed semi-hard surface from just north of the Forsyth–Dawson county line to Dawsonville and a sand clay or top soil surface from Dawsonville to just southwest of Dahlonega. The next month, it had a completed semi-hard surface from Dawsonville to about halfway between there and Dahlonega. In November, it had a completed semi-hard surface from about halfway between Dawsonville and Dahlonega to just southwest of Dahlonega. By the middle of 1933, SR 9 was under construction from the northern part of Sandy Springs to the Fulton–Forsyth county line. By the end of the year, it had a completed hard surface from the northern part of Sandy Springs to the Fulton–Forsyth county line. A few months later, it was under construction from the Fulton–Forsyth county line to Cumming and from Dawsonville to just southwest of Dahlonega. Near the end of that year, it was indicated to be "completed grading, not surfaced" from the Fulton–Forsyth county line to Cumming, a completed hard surface from Cumming to just south of the Forsyth–Dawson county line, a completed semi-hard surface from just south of the Forsyth–Dawson county line to Dawsonville, a completed hard surface from Dawsonville to just northeast of that city, and under construction from just northeast of Dawsonville to just southwest of Dahlonega. Just before 1935, the highway had a completed hard surface form Dawsonville to just northeast of Dahlonega and a completed semi-hard surface from just northeast of Dahlonega to its northern terminus. A few months later, it had a completed hard surface from just south of the Forsyth–Dawson county line to that county line. By July of that year, it was under construction from the Forsyth–Dawson county line to Dawsonville. One year later, it had a completed hard surface from the Forsyth–Dawson county line to Dawsonville. A few months later, SR 9 was under construction from just northeast of Dahlonega to a point about halfway between that city and its northern terminus. Another year later, and the highway had a completed hard surface from just northeast of Dahlonega to just northeast of the halfway point between Dahlonega and its northern terminus. By the end of the year, it was indicated to be completed, but not surfaced from just northeast of the halfway point between Dahlonega and its northern terminus to its northern terminus. Later that year, it had a completed hard surface from just northeast of the halfway point between Dahlonega and its northern terminus to its northern terminus.

1940s 
By 1941, US 19 was moved off of SR 9 south of Dawsonville. US 19 traveled on a more easterly routing, northeast to SR 53, and then followed that highway northwest to Dawsonville. About six months later, US 19 was moved back onto SR 9. The former routing of US 19 was redesignated as SR 9E.

1960s 
By 1967, SR 400 was proposed from central Atlanta to SR 9E's intersection with SR 53. Its path was planned to be just slightly to the east of both the route of US 19/SR 9 and SR 9E. Later that year, the I-285/SR 400 interchange was built, and SR 400 was under construction from I-285 to a point southeast of Roswell. The next year, SR 400 was under construction from southeast of Roswell to the Fulton–Forsyth county line.

1970s 
By 1971, SR 400 was open from I-285 to SR 120 in Alpharetta. The next year, it was under construction from SR 120 to SR 20 near Cumming. By 1975, it was open from SR 120 to SR 20 near Cumming and under construction from SR 20 to SR 306 near Coal Mountain. About two years later, SR 400 was open from SR 20 to SR 306 near Coal Mountain. Approximately three years later, it was under construction from the SR 9E/SR 53 intersection southeast of Dawsonville to SR 60 near Dahlonega. By 1982, US 19 was moved off SR 9 between I-285 in Sandy Springs and Dahlonega. It was moved onto SR 400 from I-285 to SR 369 southeast of Coal Mountain. Also, US 19 was routed north-northeast from this point, to travel on the route of SR 9E, which had been decommissioned, to SR 60 near Dahlonega. It traveled on SR 60 to that city.

Due to the transport of moonshine from the mountains of North Georgia to Atlanta, SR 9 was called Thunder Highway or Thunder Road for its use by moonshiners heading to Atlanta.

Major intersections

Roswell connector route

State Route 9 Connector (SR 9 Conn.) was a connector route for SR 9 that existed in Roswell. In 1970, it was established from SR 400 northwest to US 19/SR 9. In 1977, the eastern terminus of SR 140 in Roswell was shifted slightly to the northeast to end at US 19/SR 9's intersection with SR 9 Conn. In 1981, SR 140 was extended along the entire path of SR 9 Conn., replacing it.

See also

References

External links 

 

009
Transportation in Fulton County, Georgia
Transportation in Forsyth County, Georgia
Transportation in Dawson County, Georgia
Transportation in Lumpkin County, Georgia
Roads in Atlanta
Sandy Springs, Georgia
Roswell, Georgia
Chattahoochee-Oconee National Forest
U.S. Route 19